The 2008–09 Hellenic Football League season was the 56th in the history of the Hellenic Football League, a football competition in England.

Premier Division

Premier Division featured 18 clubs which competed in the division last season, along with four new clubs:
Chalfont Wasps, promoted from Division One East
Marlow United, promoted from Division One East
Old Woodstock Town, promoted from Division One West
Reading Town, transferred from the Combined Counties League

League table

Division One East

Division One East featured 15 clubs which competed in the division last season, along with three clubs:
Launton Sports, transferred from Division One West
Newbury, joined from the Reading Football League
South Kilburn, joined from the Middlesex County League

League table

Division One West

Division One West featured 15 clubs which competed in the division last season, along with two new clubs:
Hardwicke, joined from the Gloucestershire County League
Lydney Town, demoted from the Premier Division

League table

References

External links
 Hellenic Football League

2008-09
9